The 2010 Prince Edward Island Scotties Tournament of Hearts was held Jan. 2–5 in at the Montague Curling Club in Montague, Prince Edward Island. The winning team will represent Prince Edward Island at the 2010 Scotties Tournament of Hearts in Sault Ste. Marie, Ontario.

Teams

Draws

External links
Event site

Prince Edward Island
Curling competitions in Prince Edward Island
Scotties Tournament of Hearts
Prince Edward Island Scotties Tournament of Hearts
Montague, Prince Edward Island